Petra Krejsová (born 30 June 1990) is a Czech former professional tennis player.

In her career, Krejsová won seven singles titles and 29 doubles titles on the ITF Women's Circuit. On 23 October 2017, she reached her best singles ranking of world No. 221. On 23 July 2018, she peaked at No. 158 in the WTA doubles rankings.

ITF finals

Singles: 11 (7 titles, 4 runner–ups)

Doubles: 54 (29 titles, 25 runner–ups)

References

External links
 
 

1990 births
Living people
Czech female tennis players
Tennis players from Prague
21st-century Czech women